Glenea xanthotaenia is a species of beetle in the family Cerambycidae. It was described by Gestro in 1875. It is known from Papua New Guinea.

References

xanthotaenia
Beetles described in 1875